Carabanchel Bajo (or Carabanchel de Yuso) was a municipality of Spain, located in the province of Madrid.

The settlement was founded by the mid-15th century, when a group of neighbors moved there and the Church of San Pedro was built. Straddling the right (south) bank of the Manzanares and enjoying a healthier climate than Madrid and beautiful sights of the latter, the village (just like the neighbouring Carabanchel Alto, together collectively known as Los carabancheles) became a favourite location for the construction of quintas for the leisure of the Madrilenian bourgeoisie and aristocracy in the 18th century. Annexed by the municipality of Madrid on 29 April 1948, its former territory currently comprises part of the districts of Latina, Carabanchel and Usera.

References 
Citations

Bibliography
 
 
 

History of Madrid
Former municipalities in Spain